Horacio Estrada Jiménez (born October 19, 1975) is a Venezuelan former relief pitcher in Major League Baseball. Listed at 6' 1", Weight: 185 lb., Estrada batted and threw left handed. He was born in San Joaquín, Carabobo.

Career
Estrada played from 1999 through 2001 for the Milwaukee Brewers and  Colorado Rockies (2001). In a three-season career, he compiled a 4–1 record with 22 strikeouts and a 7.50 ERA in 36 innings of work.

He has also pitched with four different teams of the Venezuelan Professional Baseball League, most prominently for the Tigres de Aragua club.

On January 17, 2004 he broke his hip when the team bus he was on crashed with a van. He returned in the 2006–2007 season, posting a 5-1 record and a 1.96 ERA, while allowing 7.27 hits per nine innings pitched. He was then named Pitcher of the Year in the Venezuelan league, receiving Carrao Bracho Trophy honors.

See also
 List of Major League Baseball players from Venezuela

External links
, or Retrosheet, or  Pelota Binaria (Venezuelan Winter League), or CPBL

1975 births
Living people
Arizona League Brewers players
Beloit Snappers players
Caribes de Oriente players
Colorado Rockies players
Colorado Springs Sky Sox players
El Paso Diablos players
Guerreros de Oaxaca players
Hanwha Eagles players
Helena Brewers players
Indianapolis Indians players
KBO League pitchers
La New Bears players
Louisville Redbirds players
Louisville RiverBats players
Major League Baseball pitchers
Major League Baseball players from Venezuela
Mexican League baseball pitchers
Milwaukee Brewers players
Navegantes del Magallanes players
New Britain Rock Cats players
Ottawa Lynx players
Pastora de los Llanos players
People from Carabobo
Stockton Ports players
T & A San Marino players
Tigres de Aragua players
Tucson Sidewinders players
Vaqueros Laguna players
Venezuelan expatriate baseball players in Canada
Venezuelan expatriate baseball players in Mexico
Venezuelan expatriate baseball players in South Korea
Venezuelan expatriate baseball players in Taiwan
Venezuelan expatriate baseball players in the United States
Venezuelan expatriate baseball players in San Marino